Thomas Glacier is a roughly Z-shaped glacier which drains the southeast slopes of Vinson Massif and flows for 17 nautical miles (31 km) through the south part of the Sentinel Range, Ellsworth Mountains, leaving the range between Doyran and Petvar Heights south of Johnson Spur.

The glacier was discovered by U.S. Navy Squadron VX-6 on photographic flights of December 14–15, 1959, and mapped by United States Geological Survey (USGS) from the photos. It was named by Advisory Committee on Antarctic Names (US-ACAN) for R. Admiral Charles W. Thomas, USCG, veteran of Antarctic expeditions in the 1950s.

Tributaries glaciers
 Kornicker Glacier
 Saltzman Glacier
 Sowers Glacier
 Aster Glacier
 Della Pia Glacier
 Obelya Glacier

See also
 List of glaciers in the Antarctic
 Glaciology

Maps
 Vinson Massif.  Scale 1:250 000 topographic map.  Reston, Virginia: US Geological Survey, 1988.
 Antarctic Digital Database (ADD). Scale 1:250000 topographic map of Antarctica. Scientific Committee on Antarctic Research (SCAR). Since 1993, regularly updated.

References
 

Glaciers of Ellsworth Land